The Church of the St. Michael the Archangel is a former Roman Catholic parish church under the authority of the Roman Catholic Archdiocese of New York, located in Rockland Lake, Rockland County, New York.

History
St. Michael's was formed originally as an out-mission of Spring Valley, then an annex of St. Peter's, Haverstraw. With the establishment of St. Paul's, Fr. John Nageleisen was instructed by Archbishop Michael A. Corrigan to oversee the building of the first Church and School of St. Michael in Rockland Lake in 1901.

In 1901 an empty church at Nyack was donated, dismantled and re-assembled at Rockland Lake  as a mission station of Congers. The parish was established in 1909 with Father Kozimir Zakrasser (Zakrajsek) O.F.M. as pastor. The church burned down in 1914, but was rebuilt in brick. The new church was completed in 1917.

After the quarry and ice industries closed down in the 1920s, the parish was suppressed in 1927 to become again a mission of St. Paul's Church in Congers from 1927 to 1963.

Development of Rockland Lake State Park as part of the Palisades Interstate Park system began in 1958. As residents sold their homes and moved away the congregation dwindled. The mission was closed in 1963. The building was sold to the Palisades Interstate Commission which later demolished it in the course of establishing the state park.

References 

Christian organizations established in 1901
1963 disestablishments in New York (state)
Closed churches in the Roman Catholic Archdiocese of New York
Closed churches in New York (state)
Roman Catholic churches in New York (state)
Churches in Rockland County, New York
Demolished buildings and structures in New York (state)